Edward Hammond Clarke (Feb. 2, 1820 – Nov. 30, 1877) was an American physician. Clarke obtained an undergraduate degree came from Harvard College and a medical degree from the University of Pennsylvania.

Based in Boston, Clarke specialized in otology and published several books including Sex in Education; or, A Fair Chance for the Girls. He held a teaching position at Harvard Medical School from 1855 to 1872.

Biography

Early life and education 
Born in Norton, Massachusetts, he was the fourth and youngest child of Reverend Pitt Clarke and Mary Jones Clarke. His father, Reverend, graduated from Harvard College and was a Minister of the first Congregational Society in Norton for forty-two years. His mother was known for writing many poems.

Edward went to Harvard College for his undergraduate studies. During his junior year, he suffered hemorrhage in the lungs and became so ill that he could not attend Commencement and was not able to obtain honors for his studies, despite being first in the class. He graduated in 1841. After college, he decided to pursue medicine and enrolled in the medical school at the University of Pennsylvania. He got his M.D. in 1846 and spent a great amount of time traveling in Europe, where he spent time studying otology.

Medical practice 
After his return, he practiced in Boston and specialized in otology and primary care. Edward was a great physician and well known for his expertise in otology although he had to give up the specialization and focus on primary care later on. Dr. Clarke was a well-respected and popular physician among his patients. As he became more well-known, most of his patients were in the upper middle class. He also did many consultations by visiting patients at their homes. He was the epitome of a great physician, possessing numerous great qualities and was described as having an “inquiring, observant, reflective, and judicial” mind very suitable for medical practice. However, most of the records of Dr. Clarke's patients were burnt since his death as he did not wish to disclose information about his patients to the public.

He became the Professor of Materia Medica at Harvard Medical School in 1855 and held the position until 1872. Dr. Clarke was later diagnosed with cancer in the lower part of his intestine and eventually passed away in 1877. Despite the deterioration of his health, he still managed to write about subjects that interested him. He had several publications, including Sex in Education; or, A Fair Chance for the Girls, The Building of a Brain, and Visions: A Study of False Sight.

Publication 

The book, Sex in Education; or, A Fair Chance for the Girls (1875), in which Dr. Clarke discussed his views on the education for boys and girls, caused great controversy, especially among women's rights activists. The book was so popular that it sold out in a week. In the 1870s, education was a much-debated topic, especially education for women. People at the time thought education for girls should be different from boys. Dr. Clarke argued that girls would not be able to withstand the “intellectual demands traditionally placed on boys” and that imposing such demands on girls during puberty would lead to “physiological disasters,” such as “nervous collapse and sterility.” He backed up his claims with cases of seven women whose health conditions deteriorated as a result of arduous studies in college. For example, one of the women who went to Vassar College and was referred to Dr. Clarke was depicted as “neuralgic and hysterical.”

Clarke averred that letting women undergo the same education as men would cause harm in women's reproductive organs. His views were not uncommon at the time. Many physicians, such as the gynecologist Thomas A. Emmet and the neurologist S. Weir Mitchell, also disapproved of letting women undergo the same strenuous education as men. However, there were some women rights activists, such as Emma Willard, who fought for equality in education for girls and boys. Throughout the country, women in higher education institutions condemned Clarke's writing. Those who supported higher education for women agreed with Clarke on the ideas that women were not as physically and intellectually capable as men, but believed that they could endure the intellectual demands of higher education.

Clarke and other antifeminists used Darwinism to justify their beliefs in the inherent biological differences between men and women. Nonetheless, no one could justify their arguments on higher education for women because higher education for women had just begun and there were not enough data about the effect of higher education on women's health.

Notable Rebuttal by Jacobi 
Mary Putnam Jacobi wrote an essay, eventually published as a book, called The Question of Rest for Women during Menstruation; it was a response to Clarke’s publication, Sex in Education; or, A Fair Chance for the Girls. Jacobi collected extensive physiological data on women throughout their menstrual cycle, including muscle strength tests before and after menstruation. She concluded that "there is nothing in the nature of menstruation to imply the necessity, or even desirability, of rest."
For the essay she received Harvard University's Boylston Prize in 1876, making her the first woman to win that prize.

Views on education 
Clarke first revealed his views on education for women when he was invited to speak at the New England Women's Club of Boston in 1872. Although he claimed that women should be allowed to learn whatever they could, he did not think women had the same ability to succeed as men. In fact, he believed that women's educational capacity was limited by their physiology. The members of the Woman's Club were shocked by Clarke's idea of the intrinsic inferiority of women's potential for education.

See also

 Eliza Bisbee Duffey

References

External links
 

American primary care physicians
Harvard Medical School alumni
1820 births
1877 deaths
People from Norton, Massachusetts